Goniostemma is a genus of plant in family Apocynaceae, first described as a genus in 1834. It contains two known species, one native to China, the other to India and Bangladesh.

Species
 Goniostemma acuminata Wight - India, Bangladesh
 Goniostemma punctatum Tsiang & P.T. Li - Yunnan

References

Secamonoideae
Apocynaceae genera
Taxonomy articles created by Polbot